John Phakrases was a Byzantine nobleman and courtier.

Little is known about his life. His unnamed father was logothetes ton agelon, and he was possibly the grandson of a namesake 13th-century official who was a friend and correspondent of Patriarch Gregory II of Constantinople. Of his career, it is only known that Phakrases served as parakoimomenos under Emperor Andronikos II Palaiologos (r. 1282–1328). Maximos Planoudes intended to teach him, and a manuscript names him as the author of a list of offices in verse. Phakrases was married and had children. Their names are unknown, as is that of his wife, on whose death Manuel Gabalas composed a funeral elegy.

References

Sources
 
 

14th-century Byzantine people
14th-century Byzantine writers
Parakoimomenoi
Year of birth unknown
Year of death unknown